Jerry McAuliffe (27 August 1910 – 4 May 1959) was an  Australian rules footballer who played with Hawthorn in the Victorian Football League (VFL).

McAuliffe coached Leeton Football Club to the 1935 premiership of the Kinloch Cup Competition.

Notes

External links 

1910 births
1959 deaths
Australian rules footballers from Western Australia
Hawthorn Football Club players
Claremont Football Club players